Tillandsia hubertiana is a species in the genus Tillandsia. This species is endemic to Mexico.

References

hubertiana
Flora of Mexico